Dorrough Music is the debut studio album by American rapper Dorrough. It was released on August 4, 2009, by NGenius Entertainment, Prime Time Click and E1 Music. The album was supported by the singles: "Ice Cream Paint Job", "Walk That Walk" and "Wired to the T". The album debuted at number 36 on the US Billboard 200, selling 13,000 copies in the first-week.

Critical reception 

Dorrough Music received mixed reviews from music critics. Steve 'Flash' Juon of RapReviews said he saw potential in Dorrough with his organic delivery and personal take with the listeners resembling that of fellow Texas MC Scarface. AllMusic's David Jeffries found the album filled with samey tracks compared to the first two singles, average witty lyricism and Dorrough's bland vocal delivery, concluding that "Fans who like their hip-hop Lone Star State-big will find the rough edges easy to ignore. Everyone else should focus on the singles, which are satisfying in any territory. " Mitchell Hanna of HipHopDX said that, "Despite his aptitude for success, his unmemorable and often undistinguishable style; lukewarm lyricism; and relatively low industry support, leave Dorrough with plenty of room for improvement for his sophomore album."

Track listing

Charts

References 

2009 debut albums
Dorrough albums
E1 Music albums